Staines is a surname. Notable people with the surname include:

 Alberto Campbell-Staines (born 1993), Jamaican-born Australian athlete
 Alfred Staines (1838–1910), British cricketer
 Bill Staines (1947–2021), American folk singer
 Charles Staines, Welsh rugby-league footballer
 Charlie Staines (born 2000), Australian-born Samoan international rugby-league footballer
 David Staines (born 1946), Canadian literary critic
 Emery Staines (1874–1959), Australian rules footballer
 Frank Staines (1876–1937), Australian rules footballer
 Gary Staines (born 1963), British long-distance runner
 Gladys Staines (born 1951), Australian missionary
 Graham Staines (1941–1999), Australian missionary
 Hubert Staines (1893–1970), Canadian politician
 John Staines, New Zealand association footballer
 Laura Staines (born 1953), American rower
 María Arias Staines (born 1941), Mexican politician
 Mavis Staines (born 1954), Canadian ballet dancer
 Michael Staines (1885–1955), Irish politician
 Mike Staines (born 1949), British-born American rower
 Paul Staines (born 1967), British political blogger
 Richard of Staines (d.1277), medieval clerical judge
 Thomas Staines (1776–1830), Royal Navy officer
 William Staines (1731–1807), the Lord Mayor of London between 1800 and 1801

Fictional characters 
 Elsie Staines, from the British fantasy crime drama Ashes to Ashes, portrayed by Rita Davies
 George Staines, birthname of transgender character Gaynor Mason, from the British fantasy crime drama Ashes to Ashes, portrayed by Sara Stewart
 Monty Staines, from the British sitcom Benidorm, portrayed by John Challis
 Nikki Staines, from the American legal drama Law & Order: Special Victims Unit, portrayed by Callie Thorne
 Stanley and Mary-Jane Staines, protagonists from the Australian animated children's series Staines Down Drains; the show also included their mother, Betty Staines

Surnames
English-language surnames